Casa Grande may refer to:

Places

Australia 
 Casa Grande, Mount Isa, a heritage-listed house in Queensland

Brazil 
Casa Grande, Minas Gerais, a municipality in the state of Minas Gerais
Casa grande (sugar plantation), the home of the owner of a sugar plantation in Brazilian history

Mexico 
Casas Grandes Municipality in Chihuahua, Mexico
Casas Grandes, an architectural zone in the municipality
Nuevo Casas Grandes, another municipality in the state of Chihuahua
 Casa Grande (museum), an old ranch in the state of Veracruz, home of Lucía Zárate

Peru 
 Casa Grande, Peru, a city in the Casa Grande District, in the Ascope Province of La Libertad Region

United States 
 Casa Grande Ruins National Monument, a national monument outside Coolidge, Arizona
 Casa Grande, Arizona
 Casa Grande, Pasadena, California

Other
 casa-grande, Brazilian plantation estates
 Casa Grande Municipal Airport, a general aviation airport in Casa Grande, Arizona
 Casa Grande High School, a secondary school in Petaluma, California
 Casa Grande (soil), the state soil of Arizona
 The Great House (film) (La casa grande), a 1975 Spanish drama film
 Casa Grande (film), a 2014 Brazilian film starring Marcello Novaes and Suzana Pires
 
 Casa Grande-class dock landing ship
 Casagrande, a surname
 The Casagrandes, a Nickelodeon TV series

See also
 
 
 Casa Grande Hotel (disambiguation)
 Casa (disambiguation)
 Grande (disambiguation)
 Grand (disambiguation)